Caroline Maheux (born 27 April 1969) is a Canadian speed skater. She competed in the women's 1500 metres at the 1988 Winter Olympics.

References

External links
 

1969 births
Living people
Canadian female speed skaters
Olympic speed skaters of Canada
Speed skaters at the 1988 Winter Olympics
Sportspeople from Sherbrooke